Lists of films set around holidays includes:

 List of films set around Easter
 List of films set around Christmas
 List of films set around Father's Day
 List of films set around Halloween
 List of films set around Thanksgiving
 List of films set around May Day
 List of films set around Mother's Day
 List of films set around New Year
 List of films set around St. Patrick's Day
 List of films set around Valentine's Day
 List of holiday horror films

 
Lists of film lists